A musical road is a road, or section of a road, which when driven over causes a tactile vibration and audible rumbling that can be felt through the wheels and body of the vehicle. This rumbling is heard within the car as well as the surrounding area, in the form of a musical tune. Musical roads are known to currently exist in Denmark, Hungary, Japan, South Korea, the United States, China, Iran, Taiwan, Indonesia and the United Arab Emirates. In the past, they could be found in France and the Netherlands as well.

Each note is produced by varying the spacing of strips in, or on, the road. For example, an E note requires a frequency of around 330 vibrations a second.

By country

Denmark

The first known musical road, the Asphaltophone, was created in October 1995 in Gylling, Denmark, by Steen Krarup Jensen and Jakob Freud-Magnus, two Danish artists. The Asphaltophone is made from a series of raised pavement markers, similar to Botts' dots, spaced out at intermittent intervals so that as a vehicle passes over the markers, the vibrations caused by the wheels can be heard inside the car. The song played is an arpeggio in the key of F major.

France 
In 2000, a musical road with a 28-note melody composed by Gaellic Guillerm was built in the suburb of Villepinte, Seine-Saint-Denis, France. It was located on boulevard Laurent and Danielle Casanova and was supposedly paved over in 2002. However, as of 2006, subsequent visits to the site of this musical road claimed that the song could still be heard faintly.

As of 2022, if one looks at boulevard Laurent and Danielle Casanova near the intersection with Chem. du Pont des Marais via Google Maps’ street view, the rumble strips installed on the road which played the song can still be clearly seen, suggesting that the musical road is still functioning.

Hungary 

In 2019, Hungary installed a musical road in memoriam of László Bódi (better known by his stage name Cipő), lead singer from the band Republic. When going on the side of the road, one can hear an approximately 30-second snippet of their song 67-es út (Road 67).

Indonesia 
In 2019, Indonesia installed a musical road along the Ngawi–Kertosono section of the Solo–Kertosono Toll Road in Java. The song played is the first six notes of "Happy Birthday To You," but the fifth note is off-key by a half-step. It was installed to reduce the number of traffic accidents, and the song was chosen because it is familiar to the community.

Japan

In Japan, Shizuo Shinoda accidentally scraped some markings into a road with a bulldozer and drove over them and realized that it was possible to create tunes depending on the depth and spacing of the grooves. In 2007, the Hokkaido National Industrial Research Institute, which had previously worked on a system using infra-red lights to detect dangerous road surfaces, refined Shinoda's designs to create the Melody Road. They used the same concept of cutting grooves into the concrete at specific intervals and found the closer the grooves are, the higher the pitch of the sound; while grooves which are spaced farther apart create lower pitched sounds.

There are multiple permanently paved  Melody Roads sections throughout Japan. The first ones built included one in Hokkaido in Shibetsu, Nemuro which plays the "Shiretoko Love Song" on the site of where Shinoda's first bulldozer scrapings were, another in the town of Kimino in Wakayama Prefecture where a car can produce the Japanese ballad "Miagete goran yoru no hoshi wo" by Kyu Sakamoto, one in Shizuoka Prefecture on the ascending drive to Mount Fuji, and a fourth in the village of Katashina in Gunma, which consists of 2,559 grooves cut into a  stretch of existing roadway and produces the tune of "Memories of Summer". A 320-meter (1050 ft) stretch of the Ashinoko Skyline in Hakone plays "A Cruel Angel's Thesis", the theme song from the anime Neon Genesis Evangelion, when driven over at 40 km/hr. Yet another can be found on the road between Nakanojo town and Shima Onsen, which plays "Always With Me" (Japanese title: いつも何度でも, Itsumo nando demo) from the feature animation Spirited Away.

The roads work by creating sequences of variable width groove intervals to create specific low and high frequency vibrations. Some of these roads, such as one in Okinawa that produces the Japanese folk song "Futami Jowa", as well as one in Hiroshima Prefecture, are polyphonic, with different sequences of rumble strips for the left and right tires so that a melody and harmony can be heard. As of 2016, there are over 30 Melody Roads in Japan.

Netherlands
A singing road had been installed near the village of Jelsum in Friesland. The Friesland provincial anthem (De Alde Friezen) would play if drivers obeyed the speed limits, otherwise the song would play off-key. After complaints from villagers, the singing road was removed.

South Korea
The Singing Road can be found close to Anyang, Gyeonggi, South Korea, and was created using grooves cut into the ground, similar to the Japanese Melody Roads. Unlike the Japanese roads, however, which were designed to attract tourists, the Singing Road is intended to help motorists stay alert and awake – 68% of traffic accidents in South Korea are caused by inattentive, sleeping or speeding drivers. The tune played is "Mary Had a Little Lamb" and took four days to construct. It is likely that the song was chosen because the road leads to an airport - in Korean, the melody of "Mary Had a Little Lamb" is known as "Airplane," with lyrics describing an airplane flying. As of 2022, however, it was paved over and the song can no longer be heard.

As of 2022, there are five singing roads in South Korea. There were formerly six, but the first was paved over. The second one, built at an unknown date, plays a traditional folk tune called “Mountain Wind, River Wind” for guests exiting the ski resort Kangwonland. The third is located on the way from Osan to Chinhae and plays a song called “Bicycle.”

The fourth was constructed in 2019 and plays the first verse of “Twinkle Twinkle Little Star”. It was constructed inside of the Inje-Yangyang Tunnel on the Seoul-Yangyang Expressway, the longest tunnel in Korea. The fifth is located on the Donghae Expressway inside of a tunnel and plays a well-known Korean children's folk song called “Cheer Up, Dad.” The sixth one was constructed inside the Marae tunnel on route 17, but the title of the song played by the road is unknown.

China 
A 300-meter stretch of asphalt road in Beijing's south-western Fengtai district in the Qianlingshan Mountain Scenic Area has been made into a singing road and will play the tune "Ode to the Motherland", as long as drivers follow the speed limit of 40 km/h. Construction was completed in 2016. "We have small grooves built into the road surface, positioned apart with different sizes of gap according to the melody of the song. These 'rumble strips' cause the car tires to play music and then make a singing road," said Lin Zhong, general manager of Beijing Luxin Dacheng landscape architecture company. "Our first idea is to get cars moving at a constant speed. Because only in that way can you enjoy good musical effect. We use it as a reminder of speed limit," added Lin.

Two other musical roads in China exist: the first at a nature reserve in Henan that plays the national anthem and "Mo Li Hua", and the second near Yangma Dao in Yantai which plays the overture from "Carmen" and "Ode to Joy." One song is paved into each side of the road at both locations so drivers can experience a song both traveling one way and the other way.

In June 2021, a 587-meter portion of G108 in Xiayunling Township, Fangshan, Beijing, was made into a musical road which plays the tune of Without the Communist Party, There Would Be No New China. Xiayunling was the birthplace of this song.

United States

The Civic Musical Road was built on Avenue K in Lancaster, California, on 5 September 2008. Covering a quarter-mile stretch of road between 60th Street West and 70th Street West, the Civic Musical Road used grooves cut into the asphalt to replicate part of the finale of the William Tell overture. It was paved over on 23 September after nearby residents complained to the city council about noise levels. After further complaints from city residents about its removal, work began to re-create it on 15 October 2008 on Avenue G between 30th Street West and 40th Street West—this time, two miles away from any residence. This road is named after the Honda Civic. It opened two days later. The new section on Avenue G is only in the far left lane of the westbound side of the road. The road appears in Honda Civic commercials. The rhythm is recognizable, but the intervals are so far off that the melody bears only a slight resemblance to the William Tell overture, regardless of the car speed. It is likely the designers made a systematic miscalculation not to include the width of the groove in the relevant width of the spacing plus groove. This failure was made on both roads, Avenue K and Avenue G.

In October 2014, the village of Tijeras, New Mexico, installed a musical road on a two-lane stretch of U.S. Route 66 which plays "America the Beautiful", when a vehicle drives over it at 45 mph. This highway is labelled NM 333, between Miles 4 and 5, eastbound. Funded by the National Geographic Society, the project was coordinated with the New Mexico Department of Transportation who described the project as a way to get drivers to slow down, "and to bring a little excitement to an otherwise monotonous highway." By 2020, however, the tune was fading and most of the ridges were even paved over. A spokesperson for New Mexico's Department of Transportation said, "...there are no plans to restore the musical highway. The cost is outrageous, and they have since restored portions of the roadway and removed all of the signs. Unfortunately, this was part of a previous administration and never set in stone to keep up with the maintenance of this singing highway."

In October 2019, Tim Arnold, an alumnus of Auburn University's College of Engineering, created and installed a musical road that plays the first seven notes of the Auburn Tigers fight song, "War Eagle".  Inspired by previous musical roads, the short section of South Donahue Drive has been dubbed "War Eagle Road" and was created with a revolutionary process utilizing a surface-application material which does not damage the road. Working with support from Auburn University and the National Center for Asphalt Technology, Arnold developed the War Eagle Road to be a work of public art welcoming fans and rivals as they approach campus.  The project was approved by Office of the University Architect within Facilities Management and completed to coordinate with the final three home games of the Auburn Tigers football season.  The musical road has enjoyed a positive public reaction and seems to be welcomed as a permanent fixture.

United Arab Emirates
On January 13, 2023, a musical road was built in the city of Al Ain in the United Arab Emirates, playing the national anthem of the country, Ishy Bilady, when driven over. However, it is being used as an experiment; the strips on the road are temporary and will be removed in the future to study the possibility of a better implementation.

See also
 Rumble strip
 Walt Disney World singing runway

References

External links
 The Singing Road in New Mexico The Singing Road
 Locations and sounds of singing roads at Sonic Wonders
 Musical road in Lancaster, Calif. at Google Maps

Public art
Road infrastructure
Sound sculptures

Musical roads